Gordano may refer to:
 Gordano Valley in Somerset, England
 Gordano Round, a long-distance trail in the Gordano Valley
 Gordano Messaging Suite, a brand of e-mail server
 Gordano School, a secondary school in Portishead, Somerset
 Gordano services, a motorway service station on the edge of the Gordano Valley